The 1995 Villanova Wildcats football team was an American football team that represented the Villanova University as a member of the Yankee Conference during the 1995 NCAA Division I-AA football season. In their 11th year under head coach Andy Talley, the team compiled a 3–8 record.

Schedule

References

Villanova
Villanova Wildcats football seasons
Villanova Wildcats football